Haedong (also Haidong)  may refer to:
Haidong Prefecture (in the sense of ""east of the Qinghai Lake.")
a historical term for Korea (viz., from a Chinese perspective)
Haedong Seongguk Balhae, a medieval kingdom in northern Korea and southern Manchuria
Buddhism in Korea
Haedong Goseungjeon "lives of eminent Korean monks"
Haedong Gumdo "Korean swordsmanship"

See also
Names of Korea